Focal point may refer to:

 Focus (optics)
 Focus (geometry)
 Conjugate points, also called focal points
 Focal point (game theory)
 Unicom Focal Point, a portfolio management software tool
 Focal point review, a human resources process for employee evaluation
 Focal Point (album), a 1976 studio album by McCoy Tyner
 "Focal Point: Mark of the Leaf", a Naruto episode

See also
Foca Point, Signy Island, South Orkney Islands
Focal (disambiguation)
Focus (disambiguation)